Vermont Route 244 (VT 244) is a state highway located within Orange County, Vermont, United States. The route runs from VT 113 in Thetford to U.S. Route 5 (US 5) in Fairlee. VT 244 passes through the towns of Thetford, West Fairlee, and Fairlee, as well as the village of Post Mills.

Route description

Vermont Route 244 begins at an intersection with Vermont Route 113 in the village of Post Mills, within the town of Thetford. The highway traverses the shoreline of Lake Fairlee, traveling north through West Fairlee and Fairlee before turning southeast, crossing under Interstate 91 and terminating at an intersection with U.S. Route 5.

Major intersections

References

External links

244
Transportation in Orange County, Vermont